= Butlers Fork, Virginia =

Unincorporated community in Virginia, United States

Coordinates: 37°57′15″N 77°14′03″W

Butlers Fork is an unincorporated community in Caroline County, in the U.S. state of Virginia.
